Donald Brown Scott (May 12, 1923 – October 13, 1990) was an American politician who served as a Democratic member of the Wyoming House of Representatives, representing Goshen County from 1973 to 1983. He was the House's minority leader from 1981 until his retirement. As of 2020, he was the last Democrat elected to represent Goshen in the state legislature.

Scott was married to the former Lois Marie Wood on June 20, 1948. They had 4 children.

References

1923 births
1990 deaths
Democratic Party members of the Wyoming House of Representatives
People from Lingle, Wyoming
United States Army personnel of World War II
University of Wyoming alumni
20th-century American politicians